Karol Wiktor Zawodziński, pseudonym Karol de Johne, (1 June 1890 – 14 December 1949) was highly acclaimed Polish literary critic, theoretist and historian of literature. Associated with a poetical group Skamander.

Biography
Zawodziński was born on 1 June 1890 in Warsaw. In the years of 1908–1913 he studied a Roman philology at the University of Saint Petersburg. In 1914 he joined Polish Legions and during the years of 1918–1932 was an officer in a Polish Army.

In 1921 he made his own debut as a literary critic in Przegląd Warszawski, where he also published his own poetry works, later collected in Descour under pseudonym Karol de Johne. Zawodziński was awarded Golden Laurel of the Polish Academy of Literature. In 1946 he became a professor of the Nicolaus Copernicus University in Toruń.

He died on 14 December 1949 in Toruń.

Notable works
 Maria Dąbrowska. Historyczno-literackie znaczenie jej twórczości (1933)
 Zarys wersyfikacji polskiej (Outline of Polish versification), vol. 1–2 (1936–1954)
 Blaski i nędze realizmu powieściowego w latach ostatnich (1937)
 Liryka polska w dobie jej kryzysu (1939)
 Stulecie trójcy powieściopisarzy (1947)

 Works published posthumously
 Studia z wersyfikacji polskiej (1954)
 Opowieści o powieści (1963)
 Wśród poetów (1964)

Citations

References
 
 
 

1890 births
1949 deaths
Polish literary historians
Literary theorists
Writers from Warsaw
Academic staff of Nicolaus Copernicus University in Toruń
Polish Army officers
Polish literary critics
Polish male poets
Golden Laurel of the Polish Academy of Literature
20th-century Polish poets
20th-century male writers